Cape Ukoy (Russian: Mys Ukoy) is a steep, narrow cape in the western Sea of Okhotsk. It consists of high and prominent rocks. Ukoy Bay lies just west of the cape.

History

American and Russian whaleships cruised for bowhead whales off the cape in the 1850s and 1860s. They also anchored off the cape to obtain wood and water.

References

Ukoy